The short-billed miner (Geositta antarctica) is a species of bird in the family Furnariidae, probably the most southerly breeding passerine in the world. Geositta antarctica can be distinguished for the more widespread common miner by its much shorter bill and the absence of any rufous in the flight feathers.

Its natural habitat is entirely within the Patagonian steppe, and it breeds only in areas rain shadowed by the icy Andes in Santa Cruz Province and Tierra del Fuego. Geositta antarctica migrates as far north as Mendoza during the autumn and winter seasons, but keeps to arid areas, and it is most numerous on heavily grazed grassland on the leeward side of Tierra del Fuego.

Most of its habitat is in sandy soils where it forages for insects singly or in pairs. The nest is a woven cup of grass-like material, placed usually in a burrow and three eggs are laid. There are reports of mixed-species nesting colonies with other Furnariidae species.

References

short-billed miner
Birds of Patagonia
Birds of Tierra del Fuego
short-billed miner
short-billed miner
Taxonomy articles created by Polbot